The Madi family was a patrician family from Zadar. They were influential in Croatian politics from the 10th to 12th centuries.

Notable members
Andrija, prior of Zadar, founder of the St. Krševan Monastery. Died in 918.
Jelena, Croatian queen, wife of king Michael Krešimir II of Croatia, died in 976.
Grgur or Dobronja, prior of Zadar, died in 1035. Tried to make Dalmatian city-states independent from Byzantine Empire.
Čika and her daughter Domnana, the founders the Benedictine monastery of St. Maria in Zadar in 1066 which received privileges from the Croatian king Peter Krešimir IV.
Vekenega, the daughter of Čika, became a nun in 1072 and later the abbess of the convent.

References

People from Dalmatia
Politicians from Zadar
10th century in Croatia
11th century in Croatia
12th century in Croatia
Croatian noble families
Byzantine families